Adventus is the Latin word for arrival, and may mean
Adventus (ceremony), the ceremony of an emperor's formal arrival at a city (usually, but not always, Rome)
Adventus (art), the artistic convention of depicting this ceremony
The Latin word for the Christian season of Advent
 Quintus Antistius Adventus, Roman governor of Britain
Adventus Saxonum, the traditional date for the arrival of the Saxons in Britain in 449